Veronica Rose (8 July 1911 – 25 January 1968) was a British stage and film actress.

During the 1930s she appeared in a number of films directed by or starring her father-in-law Tom Walls, including several Aldwych Farce adaptations.

Selected filmography
 Leave It to Smith (1933)
 A Cuckoo in the Nest (1933)
 Turkey Time (1933)
 A Cup of Kindness (1934)
 Stormy Weather (1935)
 Fighting Stock (1935)
 Once in a Million (1936)
 For Valour (1937)
 Second Best Bed (1938)
 Old Iron (1938)
 Warn That Man (1943)
 Death in High Heels (1947)

References

External links

1911 births
1968 deaths
Scottish film actresses
Actresses from Edinburgh
20th-century Scottish actresses
British film actresses
British stage actresses